Parliamentary elections were held in Chile on 4 March 1945. Although the Conservative Party received the most votes, the Radical Party remained the largest party in the Chamber of Deputies and the Senate.

Electoral system
The term length for Senators was eight years, with around half of the Senators elected every four years. This election saw 25 of the 45 Senate seats up for election.

Results

Senate

Chamber of Deputies

References

Elections in Chile
1945 in Chile
Chile
March 1945 events in South America
Election and referendum articles with incomplete results